Thunder Oak is a 1997 heroic fantasy novel written by British author Garry Kilworth. It is the first novel in the Welkin Weasels series. The novel follows a group of anthropomorphised weasels in their quest to restore balance to their home after the disappearance of humans leaves a power vacuum, which has been filled by aggressive stoats.

Plot summary

The main introduction introduces Sylver's band of outlaws: Icham, Dredless, Mawk, Bryony, Alysoun, Miniver, Wodehed, and Luke. Sylver has heard that the sea defences around the island of Welkin are crumbling and will soon collapse completely, allowing the ocean to flood Welkin if the animals of the island don't act soon. With the help of Lord Haukin, a sympathetic stoat, who understands Sylver, Sylver decides to start out on a quest to find the missing humans who abandoned Welkin long before Sylver was born. None of the weasels know why they have evacuated, but Lord Haukin suspects, thanks to a diary left by a girl called Alice, that they were forced to leave and had no choice. His theory is supported by several clues scattered throughout the island, and the first clue is at Thunder Oak, but the weasels will need to make a long journey to reach it.

Just before departure, however, the voyage is interrupted by the Sheriff Falshed, who has been appointed by Prince Poynt to dominate the rebellious weasels and keep them under sway by enslaving them at Castle Rayn.

Falshed attempts to stop Sylver, arriving with a troop of stoats, but the outlaws cleverly ward off the attack by using missiles filled with ants, thus driving the stoats into the vast forest. They strap Falshed to a raft and send him off down the river, where, after an interval with the rats, he makes it back to his home, Castle Rayn, home of the stoats.

Meanwhile, Lord Haukin tells the weasels that to find Thunder Oak, which does not appear on any of his own maps, they need to find the broken eggshell of an eagle, as eagles fly above the planet and imprint a mental map of the globe which they telepathically pass down to their offspring.

The weasels set out to search for this egg, with the stoats in hot pursuit. Prince Poynt has also employs a mercenary fox, Magellan, to hunt down the weasels and bring Sylver to Castle Rayn.

After travelling for some while, the outlaws seek shelter at a monastery, which is home to Karnac the boar, a formidable monk and a sadistic mercenary, who sells weasel skins to the stoats in the form of drums. Karnac traps them inside his monastery, intending to wait until they starve to death before skinning them. Sylver sends Miniver out to rally a nearby village of weasels to help them. Miniver is turned down by each weasel in this town, as they fear punishment by the stoats. Hope appears lost until she meets an exceedingly dirty and eccentric weasel named Scirf, who tells her he can help them if she promises than he can join Sylver's outlaws. Miniver returns to the monastery with Scirf, and while her friends are initially sceptical, Scirf drives Karnac away by reminding him that humans loved bacon, ham, and other meat derived from the flesh of pigs. Karnac flees and the weasels reluctantly allow the overconfident Scirf to join them.

As they resume travelling with their newest member, the weasels encounter a forest full of savage pine martens, which is also inhabited by a mad witch – a moufflon named Maghatch. Maghatch blackmails Sylver into slavery by turning the other outlaws into rabbits, but Sylver escapes and enlists the help of the wild dog Gnaish. Maghatch quickly returns the outlaws to their proper forms and allows them to leave.

The weasels journey on, but are ensnared by the Hunter's Hall, which is an afterlife for virtuous hunting animals. The dead hunters tell them that as punishment for killing prey animals intended for those in the afterlife, they must work as slaves in Hunter's Hall until they have atoned for their crime. For several weeks they remain in the Hall until Mawk realises that the ethereal food is keeping them from leaving. Unable to rouse the others, he carries Scirf and escapes. When Scirf awakens, the two males find that Alysoun has followed them, and after Mawk explains the mystery of the food, they try to return and rescue their companions. They find that Hunter's Hall has vanished entirely, being reachable only through Maghatch's sorcery. They decide to backtrack to the witch's cathedral in hopes of finding another way to reach the Hall.

Back at Hunter's Hall, Sylver and the others awake to find their friends missing. Fortunately, the dead hunters have decided to set them free, and they head north hoping to meet up with the others. They are soon found by Magellan, who wounds Wodehead with an arrow before disappearing. Sylver sends Wodehead back to Halfmoon Wood along with Icham and Bryony, and goes on towards the Yellow Mountains with Miniver and Dredless. High in the mountains, they meet Magellan once more, and Dredless is killed. Miniver and Sylver escape, and find Falshed's troops, with Falshed having left to report Dredless' death to the Prince. Knowing this would be the last place Magellan would look for them, they pretend to be poor merchants and allow themselves to be captured by the soldiers.

Alysoun, Scirf, and Mawk return safely to Maghatch's chapel, and Maghatch sends them down a path which she claims will take them back to Hunter's Hall. Instead, it deposits them directly on a steep mountainside. The three are initially horrified, but Alysoun realises that these are the Yellow Mountains they've been searching for, and that the eagle's nest must be nearby. They ascend the cliffs and by nightfall come upon the nest. Inside they find the eggshell, broken in half, and imprinted with the map of the world. As they prepare to leave, with Alysoun and Scirf carrying half of the eggshell each, the mother eagle returns and attacks them. In the confusion, Alysoun falls from the ledge, but finds that the eggshell acts as a parachute, allowing her to descend safely. Seeing this, Scirf follows, using his half of the shell similarly.

Mawk is left behind and takes refuge in a hare's den until the eagle leaves. Continuing on alone, he is confronted and robbed by three weasel brothers. He finds a hostel in the mountains and no sooner has he entered than Magellan arrives. Mawk hides himself and listens as Magellan takes a room for the night. Shortly after, Falshed's troops arrive, with Sylver and Miniver in tow, still pretending to be merchants. Sylver recognises him and, trying to keep his identity secret, tells the soldiers that Mawk is one of the outlaws. Mawk tells the soldiers that he knows where Sylver is sleeping, and directs them to Magellan's room.  The stoats storm the room and in the ensuing fight, Mawk, Sylver, and Miniver escape into the mountains, where they find Scirf, by himself.

Meanwhile, having been separated from Scirf in the fall from the mountain, Alysoun finds herself in the midst of a group of hedgehogs performing a ceremony. The leader of the hedgehogs refuses to let Alysoun leave, intending her as a sacrifice to their god, the Great God Spike, a huge hedgehog built from the skeletons of other animals. Alysoun succeeds in destroying the god and escapes.

She returns to Halfmoon Wood with her half of the eggshell, where Sylver and the others are already waiting, and there learns of Dredless' death. After holding a wake for Dredless, the weasels and Lord Haukin decipher the eggshell map and discover that the first clue is hidden in a tree called Thunder Oak, far from Halfmoon Wood.

The weasels draw straws to see who will accompany Sylver to the Thunder Oak, and Mawk and Scirf are selected. Before they can begin the journey, a pack of rogue wolves lays siege to the village, but are driven away by a living statue that is seeking Scirf. The statue travels a short distance with the three weasels, hoping to find the quarry from which it was made. They come to an old abandoned church, where the gargoyles tell the statue where to find a nearby quarry.

Sylver and his companions enter the church to rest for the night, but after a noisy interruption by living angel statues, Sylver and Scirf decide to sleep in the crypts rather than the church hall. Mawk is alarmed by the idea of sleeping amidst the dead bodies, so he stays above. He awakes the following morning and finds Sylver and Scirf missing from the crypts. After a brief search he finds the two have been kidnapped by a group of mole bandits. The moles prepare to attack him, but their leader, realising that Sylver is wanted by Prince Poynt, insists that they set the weasels free.

As they continue on, the group sneaks through the marshes inhabited by the rats, only to find their way blocked by thousands of living scarecrows. The scarecrows demand that the weasels give them smoking pipes, so that they might look more like humans. Having nothing to give them, Mawk suggests they travel to a nearby abbey and ask the monks for help. From the head monk they learn that the scarecrows are terrified of mirrors, and return to the scarecrows with mirrors in hand. The scarecrows are so distraught by their reflections that they fall to the ground screaming, and the weasels pass unharmed.

Upon reaching the Thunder Oak, the weasels find the tree guarded by a stone gryphon, which will not allow them to pass, saying it does not wish for the humans to return. To the surprise of his companions, Scirf hypnotises the gryphon, putting it to sleep, and the weasels enter the Thunder Oak. Inside they find a small carving of a dormouse in a pool of water. Giving the carving to Mawk to guard, they begin to retrace their steps to Halfmoon Wood.

On the return home, Sylver receives a warning from a polecat, sent by Falshed, that Magellan is laying in wait in the forest, and, ordering Mawk and Scirf to wait for him, goes to face the fox alone. While attempting to ambush Magellan, Sylver is caught in a snare set by the bounty hunter. Magellan prepares to kill Sylver with his bow and arrow, but in a final burst of energy, Sylver pulls the iron stake holding the snare from the ground and impales Magellan with it. Mawk and Scirf find him badly injured, but alive, and together they finish the journey back to Halfmoon Wood. After showing the carving to Lord Haukin, the Welkin Weasels hold a celebration before commencing on the quest to find the next clue.

The book ends with a brief exchange between Falshed and Poynt, regarding Magellan's death.

Major characters

Weasels
 Sylver – The brave and compassionate young leader of the outlaws. He is identified by a white lightning bolt-shaped mark across one side of his face.
 Icham – Sylver's closest friend and fellow outlaw.
 Dredless – A fearless male weasel; expert shot with darts. He is killed by Magellan in the mountains.
 Mawk – A doubting but innovative male weasel.
 Bryony – A very outspoken but sensitive female. She becomes a vegetarian after being briefly turned into a rabbit by Maghatch the witch, citing a new-found empathy for prey species.
 Miniver – An unusually small female weasel. she often slips through small spaces
 Alysoun – A kind-hearted and exceptionally fleet-footed female.
 Wodehed – The magician of the band, whose spells never go right.
 Luke – The holy weasel.
 Scirf – A scruffy and eccentric male who helps the outlaws in return for being allowed to join them.

Stoats
 Lord Haukin – A kindly but forgetful old stoat. His home is filled with books left by the humans, and in a child's diary he finds the first clue to locating the humans, which he shares with Sylver. Haukin has a deep fondness for objects made of glass, and as such his rooms are full of various bottles fashioned by humans.
 Prince Poynt – The spoiled and fickle Prince of Welkin. He dismisses Sylver's warning that the levees are breaking and views the outlaws as a threat to his reign. Unlike the other stoats, his fur is always pure white, as he thinks white is a more royal colour; thus other stoats are forbidden from turning white in the winter. He is almost always complaining of being too cold.
 Sheriff Falshed – The Prince's obedient and long-suffering sheriff, who is constantly at odds with Sylver and his outlaws, and frequently being punished by the Prince for failing to capture them. He is readily identified by other characters by a large burn mark on his chest, which he received in a fight with Sylver before the beginning of the book.

Other animals
 Karnac – A vain, obese male wild boar who imprisons the Welkin Weasels with the intent of skinning them to make drums.
 Magellan – A sadistic male fox. He is a bounty hunter hired by Prince Poynt to capture Sylver and the outlaws. He is known for his cruelty as well as his deadly accuracy with a bow and arrow. Responsible for the deaths of hundreds, including both Dredless and Dredless' brother, Magellan is eventually killed by Sylver.
 Maghatch – A female mouflon who lives alone in the forest. A witch, she bribes Sylver into being her servant by turning his friends into rabbits.

Minor characters

Weasels
 Culver – A servant to Lord Haukin; serves as Haukin's memory.
 Pompom – Prince Poynt's court jester.
 Watchful, Awake, and Alert – Three brothers who rob Mawk in the mountains.

Stoats
 Lord Flaggatis – A male sorcerer banished to the land of the rats, where he seized power.
 Jessex – A nobleman in Prince Poynt's kingdom.
 Redfur – Prince Poynt's older brother, who was assassinated by Magellan to ensure that Poynt would take the throne.
 Spinfer – Falshed's servant and confidant.
 Takely – An Earl of Welkin.
 Wilisen and Elphet – Two noblemen of Welkin.

Other animals
 Gnaish – A huge male wild dog who helps the Welkin Weasels escape Maghatch.
 The Great God Spike – A gigantic hedgehog god made from the bones of other animals; worshiped by the mountain hedgehogs that capture Alysoun.
 Jaspin and Slaker – Male mole bandits who live beneath an old church.
 Kalthas – A male badger befriended by Sylver's father. He directs Sylver to the dog Gnaish to seek help.
 Kinger – Leader of the mole bandits.
 Malach, Riach, and Silach – Three of a large group of ferrets employed by Prince Poynt.

Puns, references, and literary allusions
 The overall situation of Sylver's band – living as outlaws in the woodlands, battling against a villainous prince and his corrupt sheriff – is reminiscent of the story of Robin Hood.
 The name Miniver comes from a word referring to white fur from a stoat, used to line the clothes of royalty. The term is also used in certain parts of England to refer to particularly small weasels.
 The name Mawk comes from a Middle English word meaning "excessively sentimental," reflecting the character's melodramatic personality.
 Scirf makes reference to a figure named Aristoatle, a play on the words stoat and Aristotle.
 The death of Poynt's brother King Redfur and the surrounding circumstances are based on that of William Rufus.

See also

Garry Kilworth
Welkin Weasels
Castle Storm

References

External links
 Official website of Garry Kilworth

1997 British novels
1997 fantasy novels
British fantasy novels
Children's novels about animals
Pigs in literature
Fictional weasels
British children's novels
1997 children's books